Maredubaka is a village in Rajavommangi Mandal, Alluri Sitharama Raju district in the state of Andhra Pradesh in India.

Geography 

Demographics 
 India census, Maredubaka had a population of 442, out of which 213 were male and 229 were female. The population of children below 6 years of age was 9%. The literacy rate of the village was 48%.

References 

Villages in Rajavommangi mandal